This is a list of well-known people who have been pied.

List

See also

Egging
List of practical joke topics
List of slapstick comedy topics
Pieing
Shoeing
Slapstick comedy

Notes

External links
Famous Pied Faces List (archived October 27, 2009)

References
 Rutledge, Leigh (1992). The Gay Decades. New York: Penguin. .

Dynamic lists
Lists of people by activity
Pies
Slapstick comedy